Bay View High School is a Canadian high school serving the western suburbs of Nova Scotia's Halifax Regional Municipality (HRM); namely the communities of Beechville, Lakeside, Timberlea, Tantallon and communities on the western portion of highway 333 including Peggy's Cove, Seabright and others. Bay View's feeder schools are Five Bridges Junior High School and Ridgecliff Middle School.

History 
The original school, located in the Halifax County community of Hubley, opened in September 1968. It was built by general contractor McDonald Construction of Bedford.

In 2002, the Nova Scotia Department of Education released an evaluation report as a result of an environmental assessment of the building and grounds. Several potential health and safety concerns were identified which led to the closure of the school. During this time, students were transported to other high schools in the area and a decision was made to construct a new building for the school. The new school is located in Tantallon and completed construction in 2007. The old school was completely renovated and reopened in 2006 as Five Bridges Junior High School.

Sports accomplishments 
The school mascot is the "Shark". In 2013, the Sharks football team went on to finally overcome their rivals in the city the Citadel High Phoenix in the semi-finals 31–17. Putting to what was thought to be an unstoppable force to a halt.  One week later they went on to beat the CPA Cheetahs in an amazing spectacle of a game with a total score of 24–23 win. This was the school's first championship in football in the team's existence since 2005.

Renaming 
The prior name for the school was "Sir John A. Macdonald High School". In November 2020, school principal Darlene Fitzgerald announced that plans were underway to rename the high school due to concerns over inclusivity and the indigenous history associated with Canada's first Prime Minister. "We need to ensure our future generations feel equal and protected. Our school must be a safe space for all, but a school bearing this name alienates Indigenous students," said Fitzgerald in a statement. In April 2021, the school announced it would formally change its name to "Bay View High School".

References

External links
School profile at Halifax Regional School Board
Bay View High School

High schools in Halifax, Nova Scotia
Educational institutions established in 2006
Schools in Halifax, Nova Scotia
John A. Macdonald
2006 establishments in Canada